Melocactus (melon cactus), also known as the Turk's cap cactus, or Pope's head cactus, is a genus of cactus with about 30–40 species. They are native to the Caribbean, western Mexico through Central America to northern South America, with some species along the Andes down to southern Peru, and a concentration of species in northeastern Brazil. 

The first species was named by Carl Linnaeus in 1753, as Cactus melocactus. When the genus was separated from Cactus, the pre-Linnaean name Melocactus was used. Acting on the principle of priority, in 1922 Nathaniel Britton and Joseph Rose resurrected Linnaeus' Cactus. However, the 1905 Vienna botanical congress had already rejected the name Cactus, so this name was not available, and Melocactus Link & Otto is the correct genus name.

Mature plants are easily recognizable by their cephalium, a wool- and bristle-coated structure at the apex of the plant, containing a mass of areoles from which the small flowers grow. The red, wool-coated cephalium, said to resemble the fez worn by Turkish men during the late Ottoman Empire, gives the plant one of its common names, Turk's cap cactus. It gives its name to the Turks Islands, part of the Turks and Caicos Islands.

The fruits of Melocactus are pink and resemble the shape of pepper fruits.  The fruits of this genus are edible, and in the wild they are frequently dispersed by lizards and birds.

Species
, Plants of the World Online accepted the following species:

Natural Hybrids

References

External links

 
Cactoideae genera